Steve Jennum (born c. 1961) is an American police officer from Nebraska and retired mixed martial arts fighter. He is notable for winning the UFC 3 tournament in 1994.

Mixed martial arts career
Jennum entered the UFC 3 tournament as an alternate. Ken Shamrock made it to the finals of UFC 3 but withdrew due to injuries received in the earlier fight against Felix Mitchell. Jennum then stepped in as a replacement and subsequently won his fight, winning the tournament. Therefore, Jennum only needed one fight to win the UFC 3 tournament (normally a fighter would have had to participate in three matches to win). This anomaly prompted the UFC to change its rules, requiring alternates to win a preliminary fight to balance the advantage of being an alternate.

After UFC 3, Steve Jennum would go on to win only one more fight in his career, defeating Melton Bowen in UFC 4, who was 31-6 as a professional boxer going into the bout. Jennum performed a high profile O goshi hip throw on the boxer, much to the delight of the crowd, eventually forcing him to submit to a straight armbar. Jennum could not continue in UFC 4 due to swelling of his hands after hitting Bowen repeatedly in the head when Jennum was on full mount.

Prior to his debut in the ring, Jennum was a high ranking Black Belt Instructor in Robert Bussey's Warrior International (RBWI). Jennum also started his own martial arts school in Omaha, NE. Former UFC Welterweight Champion Georges St-Pierre mentioned that watching Jennum win UFC 3 contributed to his decision to compete in mixed martial arts.

Championships and accomplishments
Ultimate Fighting Championship
 UFC 3 Ultimate Fighting Champion

Mixed martial arts record

|-
|Loss
|align=center| 2–3
|Jason Godsey
|Submission (choke)
|Extreme Challenge 4
|
|align=center| 1
|align=center| 2:02
|Council Bluffs, Iowa, United States
| 
|-
|Loss
|align=center| 2–2
|Marco Ruas
|TKO (submission to punches) 
|World Vale Tudo Championship 1 
|
|align=center| 1
|align=center| 1:44
|Tokyo, Japan
| 
|-
|Loss
|align=center| 2–1
|Tank Abbott
|Submission (neck crank)
|Ultimate Ultimate 1995
|
|align=center| 1
|align=center| 1:14
|Denver, Colorado, United States
| 
|-
|Win
|align=center| 2–0
|Melton Bowen
|Submission (armbar) 
|UFC 4
|
|align=center| 1
|align=center| 4:47
|Tulsa, Oklahoma, United States
| 
|-
|Win
|align=center| 1–0
|Harold Howard
|TKO (submission to punches)
|UFC 3
|
|align=center| 1
|align=center| 1:27
|Charlotte, North Carolina, United States
|

References

External links

Year of birth missing (living people)
Living people
American male mixed martial artists
Mixed martial artists utilizing ninjutsu
Mixed martial artists from Nebraska
Sportspeople from Omaha, Nebraska
American ninjutsu practitioners
American police officers
Ultimate Fighting Championship male fighters